Anonychomyrma incisa is a species of ant in the genus Anonychomyrma. Described by Stitz in 1932, the species is endemic to Indonesia.

References

Anonychomyrma
Hymenoptera of Asia
Insects of Indonesia
Insects described in 1932